The 2018 JSM Challenger of Champaign–Urbana was a professional tennis tournament played on hard courts. It was the twenty-third edition of the tournament which was part of the 2018 ATP Challenger Tour. It took place in Champaign, Illinois, United States between November 12 and November 17, 2018.

Singles main-draw entrants

Seeds

 1 Rankings are as of November 5, 2018.

Other entrants
The following players received wildcards into the singles main draw:
  Alexander Brown
  Ezekiel Clark
  Sebastian Korda
  Patrick Kypson

The following player received entry into the singles main draw as an alternate:
  Alexander Ritschard

The following players received entry from the qualifying draw:
  Keenan Mayo
  Ruan Roelofse
  Ryan Shane
  Mikael Torpegaard

The following player received entry as a lucky loser:
  Alafia Ayeni

Champions

Singles

 Reilly Opelka def.  Ryan Shane 7–6(8–6), 6–3.

Doubles

 Matt Reid /  John-Patrick Smith def.  Hans Hach Verdugo /  Luis David Martínez 6–4, 4–6, [10–8].

References

2018 ATP Challenger Tour
2018
Champaign
2018 in sports in Illinois